Amico is a 1949 West German comedy film directed by Gerhard T. Buchholz and starring Otto Wernicke, Margarete Haagen, and Kirsten Heiberg. It was shot at the Göttingen Studios and on location around Kassel in Hesse. The film's sets were designed by the art director Walter Haag.

Synopsis
The film focuses on a plush apartment building and its various occupants. It is owned by Robert Kornagel, a confectioner who comes into conflict with one of the new residents, retired stage actress Elisabeth Herzog over her schnauzer called Amico.

Cast

References

Bibliography

External links 
 

1949 films
1949 comedy films
German comedy films
West German films
1940s German-language films
Films directed by Gerhard T. Buchholz
Films about dogs
German black-and-white films
1940s German films
Films shot at Göttingen Studios